Henry Bathurst may refer to:

Henry Bathurst, 2nd Earl Bathurst (1714–1794), British lawyer and politician
Henry Bathurst, 3rd Earl Bathurst (1762–1834), British politician
Henry Bathurst, 4th Earl Bathurst (1790–1866), British politician
Henry Bathurst, 8th Earl Bathurst (1927–2011), British politician
Henry Bathurst (bishop) (1744–1837), Bishop of Norwich
Henry Bathurst (priest) (1781–1844), Anglican priest
Henry Bathurst (judge) (1623–1676),  English-born judge in Ireland